Induced consumption is the portion of consumption that varies with disposable income. When a change in disposable income “induces” a change in consumption on goods and services, then that changed consumption is called “induced consumption”. In contrast, expenditures for autonomous consumption do not vary with income. For instance, expenditure on a consumable that is considered a normal good would be considered to be induced.

In the simple linear consumption function,

References 
 

Consumption (macroeconomics)